Since the 10th century BCE, Jerusalem has been the holiest city, focus and spiritual center of the Jews. Jerusalem has long been embedded into Jewish religious consciousness and Jews have always studied and personalized the struggle by King David to capture Jerusalem and his desire to build the Holy Temple there, as described in the Book of Samuel and the Book of Psalms. Many of King David's yearnings about Jerusalem have been adapted into popular prayers and songs. Jews believe that in the future the rebuilt Temple in Jerusalem will become the center of worship and instruction for all mankind and consequently Jerusalem will become the spiritual center of the world.

In the Hebrew Bible
Although Jerusalem appears in the Hebrew Bible 669 times, it is not explicitly mentioned in the Pentateuch. Instead when referring to Jerusalem, the placenames Salem and Moriah, and the  term "the place that God will choose" are used:

You shall seek the place where the Lord your God chooses, out of all your tribes, to put His name for His dwelling place.

Maimonides cites various reasons why this is so, the first being that if the nations of the world had learned that this place was destined to become the centre of the highest religious ideals they would have occupied it to prevent the Jews from ever controlling it.

In Judaism it is considered the Written Law, the basis for the Oral Law (Mishnah, Talmud and Shulkhan Arukh) studied, practiced and treasured by Jews and Judaism for three millennia (list of Jewish prayers and blessings). The Talmud elaborates in great depth the Jewish connection with the city.

For example, the book of Psalms, which has been frequently recited and memorized by Jews for centuries, says:

 "By the rivers of Babylon we sat down and wept when we remembered Zion." (Psalms 137:1)
 "For there they that carried us away captive required of us a song; and they that wasted us required of us mirth, saying, Sing us one of the songs of Zion. How shall we sing the LORD's song in a strange land? If I forget thee, O Jerusalem, let my right hand forget her cunning . If I do not remember thee, let my tongue cleave to the roof of my mouth; if I prefer not Jerusalem above my chief joy. Remember, O LORD, the children of Edom in the day of Jerusalem; who said, Raze it, raze it, even to the foundation thereof; O daughter of Babylon, that art to be destroyed; happy shall he be, that repay eth thee as thou hast served us. Happy shall he be, that taketh and dasheth thy little ones against the stones." (Psalms 137:3–9) (King James Version, with italics for words not in the original Hebrew)
 "O God, the nations have entered into your inheritance, they have defiled the sanctuary of your holiness, they have turned Jerusalem into heaps of rubble...they have shed their blood like water round Jerusalem..." (Psalms 79:1–3);
 "...O Jerusalem, the built up Jerusalem is like a city that is united together...Pray for the peace of Jerusalem..." (Psalms 122:2–6);
 "Jerusalem is surrounded by mountains as God surrounds his people forever" (Psalms 125:3); 
 "The builder of Jerusalem is God, the outcast of Israel he will gather in...Praise God O Jerusalem, laud your God O Zion." (Psalms 147:2–12)

In Rabbinic literature
Jewish religious writings contain thousands of references to Jerusalem, some of which are included in the following:
If one is praying in the Land of Israel, he should direct his heart towards Jerusalem; If he is standing in Jerusalem, he should face towards the Holy Temple — Brachot 27a
Why are the fruits of Ginosar not found in Jerusalem? So that the pilgrims should not say "were it only incumbent on us to eat the fruits of Ginosar in Jerusalem, it would be enough" — Pesachim 8b
In the future the Holy One will expand Jerusalem to the extent that a horse will flee and its owner will be able to recover it [while still being within the city’s limits] — Pesachim 50a
Jerusalem was not divided among the tribes — Yoma 12a
A snake or scorpion never injured anyone in Jerusalem — Yoma 21a
Whoever did not see Jerusalem in her glory has never seen a beautiful city — Sukkah 51b
Ten measures of beauty descended to the world, Jerusalem took nine — Kidushin 49b
Jerusalem is the light of the world — Bereshit Rabbah 59
Jerusalem will not be rebuilt until the ingathering of the exiles has occurred — Tanchuma Noach 11
The Land of Israel sits at the centre of the world and Jerusalem sits at the centre of the Land of Israel — Tanchuma Kedoshim 10
Why did the omnipresent not create warm springs in Jerusalem, like those of Tiberias? So a person should not say “Let us ascend to Jerusalem in order to bathe” — Sifre Behaalotecha 89
There is no beauty like that of Jerusalem — Avot of Rabbi Natan 28
Ten miracles occurred for our forefathers in Jerusalem — Avot of Rabbi Natan 35
”From all your tribes” – This refers to Jerusalem because all Israel are partners in her — Avot of Rabbi Natan 35
In the future all the nations and kingdoms will be gathered unto Jerusalem — Avot of Rabbi Natan 35
All who pray in Jerusalem - it is as if he prayed before the throne of glory, because the gate of heaven is situated there — Pirkei de-Rabbi Eliezer 35
In the merit of Jerusalem I split the sea for them — Yalkut Shimoni Isaiah 473
In the future the suburbs of Jerusalem will be filled with precious stones and jewels and all of Israel will come and take them — Yalkut Shimoni Isaiah 478
From the day Jerusalem was destroyed, God has no joy, until He rebuilds Jerusalem and returns Israel to it — Yalkut Shimoni Lamentations 1009

In Jewish Law and custom

Temple in Jerusalem

In antiquity, Judaism revolved around the Temple in Jerusalem. The Sanhedrin, which governed the nation, was located in the Temple precincts. The Temple service was at the heart of the Rosh Hashanah and Yom Kippur proceedings. The Temple was central to the Three pilgrim festivals, namely Passover, Shavuot and Sukkot, when all Jews were incumbent to gather in Jerusalem. Every seven years all Jews were required to assemble at the Temple for the Hakhel reading. The forty-nine-day Counting of the Omer recalls the Omer offering which was offered at the Temple every day between Passover and Shavuot. The eight-day festival of Hanukkah celebrates the rededication of the Second Temple after its desecration by Antiochus IV. A number of fast days including the Ninth of Av, the Tenth of Tevet and the Seventeenth of Tammuz, all recall the destruction of the Temple.

Maimonides records a list of bylaws which applied to Jerusalem during the Temple period: A corpse must not be left within the city overnight; human remains must not be brought inside the city; its houses are not to be rented out; residence for a ger toshav was not granted; burial plots are not maintained, other than those of the House of David and Huldah which existed from ancient times; the planting of gardens and orchards is forbidden; sowing and plowing is forbidden due to the possibility of decaying produce; trees are not planted, except for rose gardens which existed in ancient times; garbage heaps are forbidden due to infestation; girders and balconies may not overhang the public domain; pressure ovens are forbidden due to the smoke; it is forbidden to raise chickens.

In commemoration
At the conclusion of the Yom Kippur service and the Passover Seder outside of Jerusalem the words "Next Year in Jerusalem" are recited. When consoling a mourner, Jews recite "May God comfort you among all the mourners of Zion and Jerusalem".
In Jerusalem itself, the Passover Seder might conclude, "Next Year in Jerusalem, the rebuilt," referring likely to the Temple that was destroyed over two millennia ago.

In prayer
In Judaism, the daily prayers contain numerous references to Jerusalem. The amidah prayer, which is recited three times on regular weekdays, must be said facing towards Jerusalem. The following supplication is contained in it:

"And to Jerusalem, Your city, may You return in compassion, and may You rest within it, as You have spoke. May You rebuild it soon in our days as an eternal structure, and may You speedily establish the throne of King David within it. Blessed are You, God, the builder of Jerusalem...May our eyes behold Your return to Zion in compassion. Blessed are you God, who restores His presence to Zion".

In the Grace After Meals which is recited after partaking of a meal eaten with bread, the following is said:

"Have mercy Lord, our God...on Jerusalem Your city, on Zion the resting place of Your glory, on the monarchy of King David Your anointed, and on the great and holy Temple upon which Your name is called...Rebuild Jerusalem, the holy city, soon in our days. Blessed are you God who rebuilds Jerusalem in His mercy, amen".

After partaking of a light meal, the thanksgiving blessing states:
"Have mercy, Lord, our God...on Jerusalem, Your city; and on Zion, the resting place of Your glory; upon Your altar, and upon Your Temple. Rebuild Jerusalem, the city of holiness, speedily in our days. Bring us up into it and gladden us in its rebuilding and let us eat from its fruit and be satisfied with its goodness and bless You upon it in holiness and purity.”

Customs in remembrance of Jerusalem
Some Jewish groups observe several customs in remembrance of Jerusalem. A tiny amount of ash is touched to the forehead of a Jewish groom before he goes to stand beneath the bridal canopy. This symbolically reminds him not to allow his own rejoicing to be "greater" than the ongoing need to recall Jerusalem's destruction. The well-known custom of the groom breaking a glass with the heel of his shoe after the wedding ceremony is also related to the subject of mourning for Jerusalem. It is a custom for some that the groom recites the sentence from Psalms, "If I forget thee, O Jerusalem, let my right hand forget [her cunning]." (Psalms 137:5).

Another ancient custom is to leave a patch of interior wall opposite the door to one's home unpainted, as a remembrance of the destruction (zecher lechurban), of the Temples and city of Jerusalem.

According to Jewish law, as an expression of mourning for Jerusalem, it is forbidden to listen to any form of music, other than on holidays and at celebrations such as weddings and inaugurations of new Torah scrolls. This prohibition, however, while codified in the Shulchan Aruch, is not followed by the vast majority of Orthodox and even Haredi Jews nowadays.

Western Wall in Jerusalem

The Western Wall (kotel hama'aravi), in the heart of the Old City of Jerusalem, is one of the holiest sites in modern Judaism. This is because it is the closest point to the original site of the Holy of Holies which is currently inaccessible to Jews. Until 1967, it was generally considered to be the only surviving remnant of the Second Temple from the era of the Roman conquests; there are said to be esoteric texts in Midrash that mention God's promise to keep this one remnant of the outer temple wall standing as a memorial and reminder of the past. Hence also the name "Wailing Wall", used by non-Jews because many Jews would traditionally cry when they came before it.

However, the capture of Eastern Jerusalem in the Six-Day War revealed that the retaining wall of the Temple Mount in fact survived in all places.

Rabbis and Jerusalem
The Talmud records that the rabbinical leader Yohanan ben Zakkai (c. 70 C.E.) urged a peaceful surrender, in order to save Jerusalem from destruction, but was not heeded as the city was under the control of the Zealots. An early expression of the Jewish desire to "return to Zion" is the journey of Yehuda Halevi, who died in about 1140. Jewish legend relates that as he came near Jerusalem, overpowered by the sight of the Holy City, he sang his most beautiful elegy, the celebrated "Zionide" Tzion ha-lo Tish'ali and that at that instant he was ridden down and killed by an Arab.

He was followed by Nahmanides (Ramban) who, in 1267 emigrated to the land of Israel, and came for a short stay to live in Jerusalem. He wrote that he found barely ten Jews, as it had been desolated by the Crusades, nevertheless, together they built a synagogue that is the oldest that still stands to this day, known as the Ramban Synagogue.

In the 18th century, both the Vilna Gaon and Baal Shem Tov instructed and sent small successive waves of their disciples to settle in Jerusalem, then under Turkish Ottoman rule. They created a Jewish religious infrastructure that remains the core of the Haredi Jewish community in Jerusalem to this day, currently led by the Edah HaChareidis. Some of the descendants of the Vilna Gaon's students established the extremely anti-Zionist Neturei Karta movement.

Creation of the State of Israel
The British Mandate of Palestine authorities created the new offices of "Chief Rabbi" in 1921 for both Ashkenazi Jews and Sephardic Jews with central offices in Jerusalem. Rabbi Abraham Isaac Kook (d. 1935) moved to Jerusalem to set up this office, associated with the "Religious Zionist" Mafdal group, becoming the first modern Chief Rabbi together with Sephardic Chief Rabbi Yaakov Meir. The official structure housing the Chief Rabbinate was completed in 1958 and is known as Heichal Shlomo.

In contrast, the Haredi Jews of Jerusalem formed the anti-Zionist Edah HaChareidis, an umbrella organization for all Haredi Jews, who were not Zionists and fiercely opposed the activities of the (Religious) Zionist movement. The first Chief Rabbi of the Edah HaChareidis was Rabbi Yosef Chaim Sonnenfeld. Several groups formerly aligned with the Edah gradually broke away from it; these include the Hasidic movements Belz and Skver. The Hasidic group Ger was never part of the Edah. Aside from the more famous Ashkenazi Edah, there is also a lesser known Sephardi Edah HaChareidit.

Jerusalem is also home to a number of the world's largest yeshivot (Talmudical and Rabbinical schools), and has become the undisputed capital of Jewish scholarly, religious and spiritual life for most of world Jewry. Examples of major yeshivos in Jerusalem are the Mir yeshiva and the Brisk yeshiva.

Major Hasidic dynasties headquartered in Jerusalem include Toldos Aharon, Toldos Avrohom Yitzchok, Dushinsky, Ger, Belz, Breslov, Karlin-Stolin, and Rachmastrivka. Most of these groups have a membership ranging from circa one thousand to tens of thousands. There are also several smaller groups, not mentioned here. (See also: :Category:Hasidic dynasties headquartered in Jerusalem.)

Jerusalem in modern Israel
Jerusalem in the 21st century is perceived by Israeli Jews in different ways, depending on their religious beliefs. In the summer of 2009, riots by Haredi Jews broke out in Jerusalem over the opening of a parking lot near the Old City on Saturdays. However, secular groups counter-protested, claiming that Jerusalem should be a city for all people, religious and non-religious. The call for an "open" Jerusalem has received support from Rabbi Dr. Donniel Hartman an Orthodox Rabbi and President of the Shalom Hartman Institute, in Jerusalem. He wrote: "As a religious Jew who is also a Zionist I believe Jerusalem is not simply important as the city of God, but as the capital of the State of Israel, a state which, as distinct from you, I value as a part of my religious life. As a committed Zionist, I believe the citizens of our country need unifying symbols around which to construct our shared collective life. Jerusalem, one of the few remaining unifying concepts in our deeply divided Jewish world, may serve as precisely such as symbol. The meaning of Jerusalem as the capital of Israel is that it is a city which belongs to all citizens of the State of Israel. While you and I may observe Shabbat in similar ways, my fellow citizens of Israel observe it very differently. While you want to preserve the city, I want to preserve our people".

See also
Jerusalem of the West
L'shana Haba'ah
Laws and customs of the Land of Israel in Judaism
Temple Denial

References

 
Judaism
Land of Israel